White Rapids is a settlement in Northumberland County, New Brunswick.

History

Notable people

See also
List of communities in New Brunswick

References

Settlements in New Brunswick
Communities in Northumberland County, New Brunswick